Juknevičius is a Lithuanian surname. Notable people with the surname include:

Antanas Juknevičius (born 1974), Lithuanian racing driver
Zenonas Juknevičius (born 1949), Lithuanian politician

Lithuanian-language surnames